Stenomicra is a genus of flies in the family Periscelididae. There are more than 20 described species in Stenomicra.

Species
These 28 species belong to the genus Stenomicra:

 Stenomicra albibasis Sabrosky, 1965
 Stenomicra angustata Coquillett, 1900
 Stenomicra angustiforceps Sabrosky, 1965
 Stenomicra argentata Sabrosky, 1965
 Stenomicra australis Malloch, 1927
 Stenomicra bicolor (Seguy, 1938)
 Stenomicra biconspicua Sabrosky, 1975
 Stenomicra claripennis (Papp, 2006)
 Stenomicra cogani Irwin, 1982
 Stenomicra deemingi Sabrosky, 1975
 Stenomicra delicata (Collin, 1944)
 Stenomicra fascipennis Malloch, 1927
 Stenomicra flava Papp, 2006
 Stenomicra flavida Hennig, 1956
 Stenomicra jordanensis Freidberg & Mathis, 2002
 Stenomicra nigricolor Sabrosky, 1975
 Stenomicra orientalis Malloch
 Stenomicra parataeniata Hennig, 1956
 Stenomicra rufithorax Sabrosky, 1975
 Stenomicra soniae Merz & Rohacek, 2005
 Stenomicra stuckenbergi Sabrosky, 1975
 Stenomicra taeniata Hennig, 1956
 Stenomicra trimaculata Sabrosky, 1975
 Stenomicra uniconspicua Sabrosky, 1975
 Stenomicra urbana Gomes, Ale-Rocha & Ferreira-Keppler, 2018
 Stenomicra variegata (Papp, 2006)
 † Stenomicra anacrostichalis Grimaldi & Mathis, 1993
 † Stenomicra sabroskyi Grimaldi & Mathis, 1993

References

Further reading

External links

 

Periscelididae
Articles created by Qbugbot
Opomyzoidea genera